Zuigaku Rempo Niwa Zenji  (1905–1993) was a Japanese Zen master.

He was born in Shizuoka, Japan. His father was a schoolmaster and his mother was a farmer. After graduating from Tokyo University, he became the head official in Tokei-in and later studied at Antai-ji. At the age of 50, Niwa became the 77th abbot of the Eihei-ji monastery. He also received the imperial title of Jikô Enkai Zenji (“Great Zen Master of Compassion, Ocean of Plenitude”).

An avid practitioner of zazen, he rebuilt the zendo (meditation hall) so that the young people in training could better engage in this essential practice.  His dharma heirs include Gudō Wafu Nishijima and Moriyama Daigyo as well as several teachers affiliated with the Taisen Deshimaru Lineage in Europe.  Zenji (literally, "Zen Master") is an honorary title given to the senior Eihei temple (Eihei-ji), headquarters of the Sōtō school, founded in the thirteenth century by Master Dogen.

Outside of Zen, he created brush calligraphy. His work was often credited to various pseudonyms.  Niwa died in 1993.

References

Zen Buddhist abbots
Zen Buddhist spiritual teachers
Japanese Buddhist clergy
Japanese scholars of Buddhism
1905 births
1993 deaths
20th-century Japanese philosophers
People from Shizuoka (city)
University of Tokyo alumni
20th-century Buddhist monks